Deuterostomia (in Greek) are animals typically characterized by their anus forming before their mouth during embryonic development. The group's sister clade is Protostomia, animals whose digestive tract development is more varied. Some examples of deuterostomes include vertebrates (and thus humans), sea stars, and crinoids.

In deuterostomy, the developing embryo's first opening (the blastopore) becomes the anus, while the mouth is formed at a different site later on. This was initially the group's distinguishing characteristic, but deuterostomy has since been discovered among protostomes as well. This group is also known as enterocoelomates, because their coelom develops through enterocoely.

The three major clades of deuterostomes are Chordata (e.g. vertebrates), Echinodermata (e.g. starfish), and Hemichordata (e.g. acorn worms). Together with Protostomia and their out-group Xenacoelomorpha, these compose the Bilateria, animals with bilateral symmetry and three germ layers.

Systematics

History
Initially, Deuterostomia included the phyla Brachiopoda, Bryozoa, Chaetognatha, and Phoronida based on morphological and embryological characteristics. However, Superphylum Deuterostomia was redefined in 1995 based on DNA molecular sequence analyses when the lophophorates were removed from it and combined with other protostome animals to form superphylum Lophotrochozoa. The phylum Chaetognatha (arrow worms) may belong here, but molecular studies have placed them in the protostomes more often.

While protostomes as a monophyletic group has strong support, research have shown that deuterostomes may be paraphyletic, and what was once considered traits of deuterostomes could instead be traits of the last common bilaterian ancestor. This suggests the deuterostome branch is very short or non-existent. The Xenambulacraria's sister group could be both the chordates or the protostomes, or be equally distantly related to them both.

Classification

These are the following phyla/subgroups of the deuterostomes:
Superphylum Deuterostomia
Phylum Chordata (vertebrates, tunicates, and lancelets)
Subphylum Cephalochordata – 1 class (lancelets)
Subphylum Tunicata (Urochordata) – 4 classes (tunicates)
Subphylum Vertebrata (Craniata) – 9 classes (vertebrates – mammals, reptiles, amphibians, birds, and fish)
Superclass Agnatha (Cyclostomata or incertae sedis) – 2 classes (jawless fish – hagfish and lampreys)
Infraphylum Gnathostomata – 7 classes (jawed vertebrates – mammals, reptiles, amphibians, birds, bony fish, and cartilaginous fish)
Superclass incertae sedis – 1 class (cartilaginous fish – sharks, skates, rays, and chimaeras)
Superclass Osteichthyes – 2 classes (bony fish, 98.8 percent of all fish – ray-finned fish and lobe-finned fish)
Superclass Tetrapoda – 4 classes (four-limbed vertebrates – mammals, reptiles, amphibians, and birds)
Phylum Hemichordata – 3 classes (hemichordates, known as acorn worms)
Phylum Echinodermata (echinoderms – sea stars, brittle stars, sea lilies, sea urchins, and sea cucumbers)
Subphylum Asterozoa – 2 classes (sea stars and brittle stars)
Subphylum Crinozoa – 1 class (sea lilies)
Subphylum Echinozoa – 2 classes (sea urchins and sea cucumbers)

Echinodermata and Hemichordata form the clade Ambulacraria. Moreover, there is a possibility that Ambulacraria can be the sister clade to Xenacoelomorpha, and form the Xenambulacraria group.

Notable characteristics

In both deuterostomes and protostomes, a zygote first develops into a hollow ball of cells, called a blastula. In deuterostomes, the early divisions occur parallel or perpendicular to the polar axis. This is called radial cleavage, and also occurs in certain protostomes, such as the lophophorates.

Most deuterostomes display indeterminate cleavage, in which the developmental fate of the cells in the developing embryo is not determined by the identity of the parent cell. Thus, if the first four cells are separated, each can develop into a complete small larva; and if a cell is removed from the blastula, the other cells will compensate.

In deuterostomes the mesoderm forms as evaginations of the developed gut that pinch off to form the coelom. This process is called enterocoely.

Another feature present in both the Hemichordata and Chordata is pharyngotremy; the presence of spiracles or gill slits into the pharynx, which is also found in some primitive fossil echinoderms (mitrates). A hollow nerve cord is found in all chordates, including tunicates (in the larval stage). Some hemichordates also have a tubular nerve cord. In the early embryonic stage, it looks like the hollow nerve cord of chordates.

Except for the echinoderms, both the hemichordates and the chordates have a thickening of the aorta, homologous to the chordate heart, which contracts to pump blood. This suggests a presence in the deuterostome ancestor of the three groups, with the echinoderms having secondarily lost it.

The highly modified nervous system of echinoderms obscures much about their ancestry, but several facts suggest that all present deuterostomes evolved from a common ancestor that had pharyngeal gill slits, a hollow nerve cord, circular and longitudinal muscles and a segmented body.

Formation of mouth and anus

The defining characteristic of the deuterostome is the fact that the blastopore (the opening at the bottom of the forming gastrula) becomes the anus, whereas in protostomes the blastopore becomes the mouth. The deuterostome mouth develops at the opposite end of the embryo, from the blastopore, and a digestive tract develops in the middle, connecting the two.

In many animals these early development stages later evolved in ways that no longer reflect these original patterns. For instance, humans have already formed a gut tube at the time of formation of the mouth and anus. Then the mouth forms first, during the fourth week of development, and the anus forms four weeks later, temporarily forming a cloaca.

Origins and evolution

The majority of animals more complex than jellyfish and other Cnidarians are split into two groups, the protostomes and deuterostomes. Chordates (which include all the vertebrates) are deuterostomes. It seems likely that the  Kimberella was a member of the protostomes. That implies that the protostome and deuterostome lineages split some time before Kimberella appeared — at least , and hence well before the start of the Cambrian , i.e. during the later part of the Ediacaran Period (circa 635-539 Mya, around the end of global Marinoan glaciation in the late Neoproterozoic). The oldest proposed deuterostome is Saccorhytus coronarius, which lived approximately 540 million years ago, but this later challenged and an ecdysozoan connection is proposed.

Fossils of one major deuterostome group, the echinoderms (whose modern members include sea stars, sea urchins and crinoids), are quite common from the start of Series 2 of the Cambrian, . The Mid Cambrian fossil Rhabdotubus johanssoni has been interpreted as a pterobranch hemichordate. Opinions differ about whether the Chengjiang fauna fossil Yunnanozoon, from the earlier Cambrian, was a hemichordate or chordate. Another Chengjiang fossil, Haikouella lanceolata, is interpreted as a chordate and possibly a craniate, as it shows signs of a heart, arteries, gill filaments, a tail, a neural chord with a brain at the front end, and possibly eyes — although it also had short tentacles round its mouth. Haikouichthys and Myllokunmingia, also from the Chengjiang fauna, are regarded as fish. Pikaia, discovered much earlier but from the Mid Cambrian Burgess Shale, is also regarded as a primitive chordate.

On the other hand, fossils of early chordates are very rare, as non-vertebrate chordates have no bone tissue or teeth, and fossils of no Post-Cambrian non-vertebrate chordates are known aside from the Permian-aged Paleobranchiostoma, trace fossils of the Ordovician colonial tunicate Catellocaula, and various Jurassic-aged and Tertiary-aged spicules tentatively attributed to ascidians.

Phylogeny
Below is a phylogenetic tree showing consensus relationships among deuterostome taxa. Phylogenomic evidence suggests the enteropneust family, Torquaratoridae, fall within the Ptychoderidae. The tree is based on 16S +18S rRNA sequence data and phylogenomic studies from multiple sources. The approximate dates for each radiation into a new clade are given in millions of years ago (Mya). Not all dates are consistent, as of date ranges only the center is given.

Support for the clade Deuterostomia is not unequivocal. In particular, the Ambulacraria appear to be related to the Xenacoelomorpha. If upheld, this raises two possibilities: either the Ambulacraria are taken out of the deuterostome-protostome dichotomy (in which case the grouping Deuterostomia dissolves, with Chordata and Protostomia grouped together as Centroneuralia), or the Xenacoelomorpha are re-positioned next to Ambulacraria within the Deuterostomia as in the above diagram.

See also

References

Further reading

External links

Introduction to the Deuterostomia UCMP
Deuterostomia at Encyclopædia Britannica

 
Ediacaran first appearances
Superphyla
Taxa named by Karl Grobben